Robert Perry Lillis (born June 2, 1930) is an American former infielder, manager, coach and scout in Major League Baseball (MLB). Lillis was an original member of the  expansion Houston Colt .45s who remained with the club (renamed the Astros in ) for more than two decades and later became its manager.

Early life
Lillis was born in Altadena, California, and he attended Pasadena High School, where he was an All-Southern California shortstop for the baseball team. Lillis played baseball at Pasadena City College and then transferred to the University of Southern California (USC).

Playing career
A shortstop by trade, he spent eight years in the Dodger farm system, buried (along with many others) behind Hall of Famer Pee Wee Reese. In , the Dodgers' first season in Lillis's home city of Los Angeles, he made the Major League team. Lillis never claimed the regular shortstop job — that would go to Maury Wills — and in the middle of the  campaign, he was traded to the St. Louis Cardinals. After a half season with the Redbirds, he was selected by Houston in the 1961 MLB expansion draft.

Lillis then spent almost six full seasons as a shortstop and utility infielder for the Astros, serving as a coach for the first two weeks of  before being activated as an infielder. Houston then released him at season's end. Over his ten-year MLB career, Lillis appeared in 817 games and batted .236 with three home runs; his 549 hits included 68 doubles and nine triples.

Coaching and managing career
After scouting and player development posts with Houston from 1968 to 1972, Lillis returned to the Astro coaching staff in 1973 and served under managers Leo Durocher, Preston Gómez and Bill Virdon. On August 10, he succeeded Virdon as manager with the club in fifth place in the National League West Division with a record of 49–62. Lillis led the team to 28 wins in 51 games and was rehired for full seasons from 1983 to 1985. 

Houston never climbed above second place, however, and even though Lillis compiled a winning 276–261 (.514) record during that period, he was replaced by Hal Lanier at the close of the 1985 campaign. The following year, Lanier would lead the Astros to a NL West title. Lillis then joined the coaching staff of a former Dodger teammate, Roger Craig, with the San Francisco Giants, and remained with the team for eleven years (through ).

Lillis is a member of the Pasadena Sports Hall of Fame.

Managerial record

See also

 List of Houston Astros team records

References

External links

1930 births
Living people
Baseball players from California
Elmira Pioneers players
Houston Astros coaches
Houston Astros managers
Houston Astros players
Houston Colt .45s players
Los Angeles Dodgers players
Major League Baseball bench coaches
Major League Baseball first base coaches
Major League Baseball infielders
Major League Baseball third base coaches
Newport News Dodgers players
People from Altadena, California
Pueblo Dodgers players
St. Louis Cardinals players
St. Paul Saints (AA) players
San Francisco Giants coaches
Spokane Indians players
USC Trojans baseball players
Pasadena High School (California) alumni